Ed is a masculine given name, usually a short form (hypocorism) of Edward, Edgar, Edmund, Edwin, Edith, etc. It may refer to:

People
 Ed Ames (born 1927), American Singer
 Ed Asner (1929–2021), American actor
 Ed Balls (born 1967), British politician
 Ed Begley (1901–1970), American actor
 Ed Begley Jr. (born 1949), American actor and environmentalist
 Ed Bruce (1939–2021), American country music songwriter-singer
 Ed Buck (born 1954), American Democrat political activist and fundraiser
 Ed Carpenter (disambiguation)
 Ed Coleman (disambiguation)
 Ed Conroy (basketball) (born 1967), American college basketball coach
 Ed Conroy (politician) (born 1946), Canadian politician
 Ed Cook (American football) (1932–2007), American National Football League player
 Ed Cook (basketball), American college basketball player and head coach
 Ed Elisma (born 1975), American basketball player
 Ed Faron (born 1947), American author and pit bull breeder
 Ed Gein (1906–1984), American murderer and body snatcher 
 Ed de Goey (born 1966), Dutch former football goalkeeper
 Ed Green (1860–1912), American Major League Baseball pitcher
 Ed Harris (born 1950), American actor, producer, director and screenwriter
 Ed Helms (born 1974), American actor and comedian
 Ed Jenkins (disambiguation)
 Ed Kennedy (infielder) (1861–1912), Major League Baseball player
 Ed Kennedy (outfielder) (1856–1905), Major League Baseball player
 Ed Kubale (1899–1971), American football player and coach
 Ed LaDou (1955–2007), American chef, known for inventing California-style pizza
 Ed Lee (disambiguation)
 Ed Long (disambiguation)
 Ed McMahon (1923–2009), American announcer, actor and singer
 Ed Miliband (born 1969), British politician
 Ed Mirvish (1914–2007), American-Canadian businessman, philanthropist and theatrical impresario
 Ed Montague (shortstop) (1905–1988), American Major League Baseball player
 Ed Montague (umpire) (born 1948), American Major League Baseball umpire
 Ed Newman (born 1951), American All-Pro football player
 Ed O'Bannon (born 1972), American basketball player
 Ed O'Neal, a member of the Dixie Melody Boys American Southern Gospel quartet
 Ed O'Neil (born 1952), American football coach and former National Football League player
 Ed O'Neil (baseball) (1859–1892), American Major League Baseball pitcher
 Ed O'Neill (born 1946), American actor
 Ed Oliver (American football) (born 1997), American football player
 Ed Orgeron (born 1961), American football coach
 Ed Price (disambiguation)
 Ed Reynolds (safety) (born 1991), American football player
 Ed Roberts (disambiguation)
 Ed Rubinoff (born 1935), American tennis player
 Ed Schultz (born 1954), American television and radio host, political commentator and former sports broadcaster
 Ed Shaw (American football) (1895–1964), American National Football League player
 Ed Sheeran (born 1991), English singer and songwriter
 Ed Skrein (born 1983), English actor and rapper
 Ed Stasium, American record producer and engineer
 Ed Sullivan (1901–1974), American television personality, reporter and syndicated columnist, creator and host of The Ed Sullivan Show
 Ed Taylor (disambiguation)
 Ed Walker (disambiguation)
 Ed Walsh (1881–1959), American Major League Baseball Hall-of-Fame pitcher and manager
 Ed Walsh Jr. (1905–1937), American Major League Baseball pitcher, son of Ed Walsh
 Ed Ward (ice hockey) (born 1969), Canadian retired National Hockey League player
 Ed Ward (writer) (1948–2021), American writer and radio commentator
 Ed. Weinberger (born 1945), American screenwriter and television producer
 Ed Williams (disambiguation)
 Ed Wood (1924–1978), American filmmaker, director, producer, actor and writer
 Ed Wright (disambiguation)
 Ed Wynn (1886–1966), American actor and comedian.
 Ed Yong (born 1981), British science journalist
 Ed Young (disambiguation)

Fictional characters
 Ed, a hyena from Digger (webcomic)
 Ed, a hyena from Disney's The Lion King
 The title talking horse of Mr. Ed, a 1960s television sitcom
 Ed Green, Detective on the television series Law & Order, portrayed by Jesse L. Martin
 Ed Grimley, created and portrayed by Martin Short
 Ed Killifer, a villain in the James Bond film Licence to Kill
 Ed Sieveking, the protagonist of the Darren Shan novel Lady of the Shades
 Ed Bighead, an anthropomorphic frog from the Nickelodeon show Rocko's Modern Life
 Ed the Sock, a puppet on television
 One of the title characters of Ed, Edd n Eddy, an animated television series
 The title character of Ed the Happy Clown, a graphic novel
Ed Galbraith, a recurring character in the Breaking Bad universe

See also
 Big Ed (disambiguation), a list of people and a fictional character with the nickname

English masculine given names
English-language masculine given names
Hypocorisms